The Metropolitan City of Messina is a metropolitan city in Sicily, Italy. Its capital is the city of Messina. It replaced the Province of Messina and comprises the city of Messina and other 107 municipalities (comuni). According to Eurostat in 2014, the FUA of the metropolitan area of Messina had 277,584 inhabitants.

The nearby archipelago of Aeolian Islands also is administratively a part of Metropolitan City of Messina.

History
It was first created by the reform of local authorities (Law 142/1990) and then established by the regional law 15 August 2015.

Geography

Territory
The metropolitan city borders with the Metropolitan City of Palermo (the former Province of Palermo), the Metropolitan City of Catania (the former Province of Catania) and the Province of Enna. Part of its territory includes the Metropolitan area of the Strait of Messina, shared with Reggio Calabria.

Municipalities

 Acquedolci
 Alcara li Fusi
 Alì
 Alì Terme
 Antillo
 Barcellona Pozzo di Gotto
 Basicò
 Brolo
 Capizzi
 Capo d'Orlando
 Capri Leone
 Caronia
 Casalvecchio Siculo
 Castel di Lucio
 Castell'Umberto
 Castelmola
 Castroreale
 Cesarò
 Condrò
 Falcone
 Ficarra
 Fiumedinisi
 Floresta
 Fondachelli-Fantina
 Forza d'Agrò
 Francavilla di Sicilia
 Frazzanò
 Furci Siculo
 Furnari
 Gaggi
 Galati Mamertino
 Gallodoro
 Giardini Naxos
 Gioiosa Marea
 Graniti
 Gualtieri Sicaminò
 Itala
 Leni
 Letojanni
 Librizzi
 Limina
 Lipari
 Longi
 Malfa
 Malvagna
 Mandanici
 Mazzarrà Sant'Andrea
 Merì
 Messina
 Milazzo
 Militello Rosmarino
 Mirto
 Mistretta
 Mojo Alcantara
 Monforte San Giorgio
 Mongiuffi Melia
 Montagnareale
 Montalbano Elicona
 Motta Camastra
 Motta d'Affermo
 Naso
 Nizza di Sicilia
 Novara di Sicilia
 Oliveri
 Pace del Mela
 Pagliara
 Patti
 Pettineo
 Piraino
 Raccuja
 Reitano
 Roccafiorita
 Roccalumera
 Roccavaldina
 Roccella Valdemone
 Rodì Milici
 Rometta
 San Filippo del Mela
 San Fratello
 San Marco d'Alunzio
 San Pier Niceto
 San Piero Patti
 San Salvatore di Fitalia
 Santa Domenica Vittoria
 Sant'Agata di Militello
 Sant'Alessio Siculo
 Santa Lucia del Mela
 Santa Marina Salina
 Sant'Angelo di Brolo
 Santa Teresa di Riva
 San Teodoro
 Santo Stefano di Camastra
 Saponara
 Savoca
 Scaletta Zanclea
 Sinagra
 Spadafora
 Taormina
 Terme Vigliatore
 Torregrotta
 Torrenova
 Tortorici
 Tripi
 Tusa
 Ucria
 Valdina
 Venetico
 Villafranca Tirrena

Government

List of Metropolitan Mayors of Messina

Traditions

See also
Province of Messina
Strait of Messina metropolitan area

References

External links

 Metropolitan City of Messina official website 

 
Messina